David Baillargeon (born 14 March 1996 in Quebec) is a Canadian professional squash player. As of April 2022, he was ranked number 65 in the world. He has competed in the main draw of multiple professional PSA tournaments.

References

1996 births
Living people
Canadian male squash players
Competitors at the 2022 World Games
21st-century Canadian people